The Centennial Garage is part of the Edmonton Transit Service (ETS) and is a targeted LEED Silver project. The bus garage was designed for the storage and maintenance of 250 regular and articulated buses as well as administration offices, dispatch and support spaces for staff. It is located at 15520 Ellerslie Road on the east side 156 Street SW in Edmonton, Alberta. This garage provides bus services to neighbourhoods in west, southwest, and downtown Edmonton. It is the first new garage to open in the City in 25 years.

Construction

Construction of the garage began in spring of 2008 and was completed on April 10, 2010, with its first day of operation being April 26, 2010. This project budget was an estimated $99 million with $89.3 million coming from the provincial government's Municipal Sustainability Initiative.

A large portion of the materials used in this green building have recycled content. According to ETS, 90% of the structural steel, 27.5% of the concrete, and 68% of the steel decking is recycled material.

Firms involved in this project were Croy D. Yee Architect Limited who provided the architectural work. Morrison Hershfield Limited provided civil, structural, mechanical, code, fire protection and building envelope engineering and project management related services. Other firms involved were Earthscape Consultants for landscape design, Suncord Engineering who also provided mechanical engineering services and Clark Builders for construction management services.

Energy usage

Some unique features of the building include but are not limited to reduction of heat islands which can impact the local microclimate, highly reflective roofing reducing the cooling energy required, indoor bus storage to provide inherent energy savings and water efficiency technologies to reduce the amount of water consumption on both the administration and bus maintenance sides of the building. Energy modeling test results indicated that the Centennial Garage is approximately 33% more energy efficient than a typical Canadian building of its size and type.

LEED goals

Some LEED goals established and upheld during the construction phase and continued after the completion of the garage are as follows:

 Diversion of 80% of construction waste away from landfills
 Regional manufacturing of over 30% of the building materials
 Good air quality for construction workers during building phase and for staff after completion
 Use of hybrid vehicles by staff
 Stormwater diversion to the snow dump site to assist in melting process
 No use of ozone-depleting refrigerants in the mechanical equipment
 Significant use of recycled building materials
 Use of low-emitting materials such as paints and coating, adhesives and sealants, carpets and particle board
 Low-consumption water fixtures in washrooms, showers and kitchen
 Specialized washing system for buses that cuts down on water use by more than half
 Landscape plants that only require natural watering
 Snow melt cooling system

External links
Morrison Hershfield: Edmonton Transit System Centennial Garage 
Clark Builders: City of Edmonton, Centennial Garage

References

Edmonton Transit Service
Buildings and structures in Edmonton
Bus transport in Alberta
Bus garages
Transport infrastructure completed in 2010